William R. Yeschek, Sr. (January 22, 1896 – April 16, 1967) was an American businessman and politician.

Born in New Bedford, Massachusetts, Yeschek was educated in Chicago, Illinois and went to the Chicago Business School. He was director of the Hill State Bank in Chicago. He was in the real estate and resort business and operated a general store in Lac du Flambeau, Wisconsin. Yeschek was the town chairman of Lac du Flambeau and also served on the Vilas County, Wisconsin Board of Supervisors. During the 1949 session, Yeschek served in the Wisconsin State Assembly and was a Republican. In 1967, Yeschek was killed in an automobile accident in Lac du Flambeau when his car hit a tree.

Notes

1896 births
1967 deaths
Politicians from New Bedford, Massachusetts
Politicians from Chicago
People from Lac du Flambeau, Wisconsin
Businesspeople from Chicago
Businesspeople from Wisconsin
Mayors of places in Wisconsin
County supervisors in Wisconsin
Republican Party members of the Wisconsin State Assembly
Road incident deaths in Wisconsin
20th-century American politicians
20th-century American businesspeople